Nazim Mammadov Museum (Azerbaijani: Nazim Məmmədov adına Azərbaycan Animasiya Muzeyi) is a virtual animation museum founded in 2015 in Azerbaijan.

History 
The museum was founded in 2015 on the initiative of the Consulate of Arts of Azerbaijan, with the support of the Youth Foundation under the President of Azerbaijan and the Ministry of Culture and Tourism of Azerbaijan. The founder of the museum is the Azerbaijani artist Dadash Mammadov. The museum is named after one of the founders of Azerbaijani animation - Nazim Mammadov.

The museum contains a database on the history of Azerbaijani animation of the 60-90-s of the XX century.

See also 
History of Azerbaijani animation

References

External links 
Official website 
2015 establishments in Azerbaijan
Museums in Baku